St Matthew's Church in Widcombe is an Anglican church located on Cambridge Place in Widcombe, the southeastern section of Bath, Somerset. Built 1846-1847 principally to designs by Bath City Architect George Phillips Manners, it is situated above the Widcombe Locks of the Kennet and Avon Canal and opposite the Church Room Institute on Cambridge Place. It is one of two churches in the parish of Widcombe, the other being the much older St Thomas à Becket.  The bells of St Matthew's were taken  from St Becket's in 1847, possibly by force.

The church is dismissively described by Pevsner in his Buildings of England guides as "St. Matthew, Cambridge Place, Widcombe. 1846–7 by Manners & Gill. Dull, in the Dec[orative] style, with a [south] tower carrying a broach spire."

The tall spire holds 6 bells.

Refurbishment during the 1970s adapted the church for use as a parish hall and provided meeting rooms and venues for various community and church events.

In the summer of 2014 a newly planted congregation led by a new full-time Priest in Charge recommenced weekly worship service on Sunday evenings.

A newly launched parish website covers both parish churches within Widcombe benefice and plays an active part of the wider Bath deanery.

References

External links

Photos of St. Matthew's, Widcombe

Widcombe
Churches in Bath, Somerset
Churches completed in 1847
19th-century Church of England church buildings
1847 establishments in England
Gothic Revival church buildings in England
Gothic Revival architecture in Somerset